Etlingera corrugata is a monocotyledonous plant species described by Axel Dalberg Poulsen and John Donald Mood. Etlingera corrugata is part of the genus Etlingera and the family Zingiberaceae. No subspecies are listed in the Catalog of Life.

References 

corrugata
Plants described in 1999
Flora of Borneo